Teuge Airport or Teuge International Airport  is a small general aviation airfield  west from Deventer and  northeast from Apeldoorn. It is located in the village of Teuge, part of the Voorst municipality in the province of Gelderland in the Netherlands.

A second runway, aligned 03/21, existed up to 2012. It saw limited use and was closed when the land on the north side of the airport was sold. Next to general aviation, the airfield is also used extensively for skydiving and glider flying. Though no scheduled international flights take place from the airport, customs services are available upon request, hence it is still designated an international airport.

Several companies at the airport specialise in aerial photography, and it is the home airfield of aerobatics pilot Frank Versteegh, a former Red Bull Air Race participant.

History and future
The airfield was constructed for civilian use in 1935. During World War II, it was used by the German Luftwaffe. Under their control the airfield was improved and expanded, however it did not see much use.  According to historical records the Royal Air Force used Teuge as an Advanced Landing Ground with designation B-95. After the war it was returned to civilian control.

References

External links
 
 Teuge Airport official website
 Airliners.net – Photos made at Teuge airport

Airports in Gelderland
Voorst